The Saberin Takavar Brigade (meaning Steadfasts Commando Battalions) also known as Saberin Unit is an elite Takavar unit in the Ground Forces of the Islamic Revolutionary Guard Corps. It is considered one of the best Takavar units in the Iranian Armed Forces, with decades of military and combat experience both at home and specially in overseas operations in neighbouring countries. It is one of the most exclusive units in the IRGC, having at least 6000 members, all of them volunteers and handpicked from the best and most capable units in the IRGC Ground, Air and Sea forces. 

Together with the Quds Force operatives and the Sepah Navy Special Force marines, they are considered la crème de la crème of the IRGC, its top tier units and the best soldiers within the 
Corps.

Origin 
“Saberin” means the patient ones. According to commanders, the unit's name is inspired by the  verse Quran 8:65, which states: “ O Prophet! Inspire the believers to conquer all fear of death when fighting, [so that,] if there be twenty of you who are patient in adversity, they might overcome two hundred; and [that,] if there be one hundred of you, they might overcome one thousand…”

After the Iran-Iraq War (1980-1988), the IRGC Ground Forces saw the need to establish a special forces unit capable of undertaking difficult combat operations from land, sea, and air. This would be a different function than the Qods Force, the external operations unit. In the year 2000, the then IRGC commander, General Mohammad Ali Jafari funded the Saberin unit. The current Saberin commander is Brigadier General Sadegh Mahmoudi. According to Brigadier General Morteza Mirian, the commander of Saberin operations against PJAK in 2012 and deputy commander of IRGC Ground Forces Operations Directorate, the unit emulates from tactics deployed by 11 special forces units, particularly the British Special Air Service. They also studied the U.S. and Israeli special forces.

As with any IRGC unit, the Saberin Brigade is a strong ideological military force. Thus, the unit places two essential requirements among its fighters to possess: First, faith , extreme loyalty and ideological commitment to the Islamic Republic, and second, a rigorous technical knowledge and combat skills on the battlefield. The Saberin is known for its special emphasis on sniper training, producing some of the best snipers in the Iranian Armed Forces.

Description 

Despite being one of the newest units in the IRGC, having been created in the 2000, its one of its most battle-hardened troops, with hundred of operations both inside and outside Iran, against terrorist and subversive elements. Recently, it has been specially active in conflicts around the region, such as Syria and Iraq. As a result, the unit, has transformed itself, together with the Quds Force, in an essential part of the Iranian expeditionary forces and in the symbol of its power projection in the region. The IRGCGF Saberin units are highly trained in a numerous specialized capabilities, such as raiding,  hostage rescue, heliborne assault, counter-terrorism operations and special reconnaissance. Some Saberin personnel use ultralight aircraft and are capable of conducting operations in any kind of terrain and environmental conditions, including mountains, deserts, and swamps. As stated before, the Saberin personnel have also been deployed to Syria to support Iranian combat operations. The Department of Defense's 2010 Military Power of Iran report:

“Each Provincial Corps in the  
IRGCGF possesses a unit, called Saberin, which has special operations capabilities. These units rotate to the northwest to perform counter-insurgency against Kurdish PJAK and to the southeast to operate against Jundallah, and recently have been directly involved in other conflicts of the region, such as Syria.” The Unit, has a close relationship with other special forces of the 
Iranian Armed Forces, specially with the 65th NOHED Brigade, having received training from them regularly since its foundation.

The Saberin Unit ranks its commandos according to three levels:
 Rapid Response (Vakonesh-e Sarie);
 Special Force (Nirooy-e Vijeh);
 Special Operations Force (Nirooy-e Makhsoos).

References

External links

Special forces of Iran
Military units and formations of Army of the Guardians of the Islamic Revolution